Christoph Müller (born 1968) is a retired Austrian ski jumper.

In the World Cup he finished once among the top 15, his best result being a twelfth place from Sapporo in January 1987.

He finished third overall in the 1992-1993 Continental Cup.

External links

1968 births
Living people
Austrian male ski jumpers